Southwest Christian School is a private Christian K-12 grade school, middle school & high school in Beaverton, Oregon, United States.

References

Educational institutions established in 1973
High schools in Washington County, Oregon
Education in Beaverton, Oregon
Christian schools in Oregon
Buildings and structures in Beaverton, Oregon
Private high schools in Oregon
Private middle schools in Oregon
Private elementary schools in Oregon
1973 establishments in Oregon